Borrelia tanukii is a spirochete bacterium first isolated from specimens of Ixodes tanuki, hence its name.

References

Further reading

External links
NCBI Taxonomy Browser - Borrelia

tanukii
Bacteria described in 1996